Gurugram Rajiv Gandhi Trust land grab case against Robert Vadra and Bhupinder Singh Hooda is being investigated by the Central Bureau of Investigation (CBI) as per Supreme Court of India's order. In the Gurugram Rajiv Gandhi Trust land grab scam between 2004 and 2014, then Government of Haryana administration of Indian National Congress's Chief Minister Bhupinder Singh Hooda, had handed over panchayat land to the Rajiv Gandhi Charitable Trust in the name of public interest use, resulting in this trust being sued by the gram panchayat in Punjab and Haryana High Court against the land grabbing of the Gandhi family by the Hooda government. Then Chief Minister Bhupinder Singh Hooda. who also held the charge of Panchayat department at that time, had approved the grant of 5.3 acre panchayat land to Rajiv Gandhi Trust for 33 years at a rate of Rs 3 lakh per acre in January 2010, trust applied for the change of land use on 3 December 2010, which was approved on the same day.

There are a total of 6 CBI cases and several other vigilance department investigations against Hooda underway. Central Bureau of Investigation is investigating several scams, mostly related to illegal land grab, that took place during his rule in Haryana. These investigations include the Gurugram-Manesar IMT land scam, Robert Vadra DLF land grab scam, Sonepat-Kharkhoda IMT land scam case, Garhi Sampla Uddar Gagan land scam, Panchkula-HUDA Industrial plots allotment scam, AJL-National Herald Panchkula land grab scam, Haryana Forestry scam case and Haryana Raxil drug purchase scam. He has been already chargesheeted in the Manesar-Gurugram land scam, while other cases are still under investigation (c. March 2018). Hooda acquired land from the illiterate poor farmers at throwaway prices in the name of "public interest" and licensed it to builders by granting them out-of-turn favors, which caused the exponential rise in the land price resulting in big gains for the builders. During his 10-year rule as Chief Minister, Hooda, licensed a massive 24,825 acres of land compared to just 8,550.32 acres by successive Chief Ministers in the 23 years preceding Hooda rule.

Details

Modus of scam
After Comptroller and Auditor General of India (CAG) in 2013 had blamed the Hooda government for flouting the rules to lease Ulhawas gram panchayat land to Rajiv Gandhi the trust in violation of rules, the Punjab and Haryana High Court had questioned Hood government for not handing case over to CBI. Hooda government in turn challenged the High Court decision of CBI inquiry in the Supreme Court. Supreme Court asked Haryana's new government of Chief Minister Manohar Lal Khattar to hand over the case to CBI for inquiry. Subsequently, Haryana government handed this case over to CBI. New government of Haryana, has also initiated the process to recover this land from the trust.

Current status: CBI inquiry
High court and Supreme court had asked for the CBI inquiry in this case. The case is currently being probed by CBI under the direction of Supreme Court, and CBI has filed a chargesheet. This case is related to the larger Gurugram-Manesar IMT land scam case.

See also
Arvind Mayaram
 Corruption in India
 National Herald scam
 Rajiv Gandhi Charitable Trust land grab cases
 Robert Vadra land grab cases
 List of scams in India

References

High Courts of India cases
21st-century scandals
Cover-ups
Criminal investigation
Corruption in India
Lawsuits
Trials in India
Corruption in Haryana
Supreme Court of India cases
Political corruption in India
Indian National Congress of Haryana